is a town in Nishiusuki District, Miyazaki Prefecture, Japan. As of October 1, 2019, the town has an estimated population of 11,959 and a density of 50.3 persons per km². The total area is 237.54 km².

Geography
Takachiho is in the northernmost part of Miyazaki Prefecture, bordering Kumamoto Prefecture on its north and northwest sides and Ōita Prefecture on its north and northeast sides. The Gokase River flows from the west to the southeast part of town.

The heart of the town is at its center, around the now-defunct Takachiho Station and the business office of Takachiho Kotsu, the town's public transportation company. Takachiho Gorge, in the southern part of town, is fairly famous as a tourist attraction.

Takachiho is about 120 km northwest of the prefectural capital of Miyazaki and about 80 km southeast of the city of Kumamoto. Due to no public transportation facilities, nor any national highways to Miyazaki, it takes about three hours to get there.

Neighboring municipalities

Miyazaki Prefecture
Nishiusuki District: Gokase, Hinokage
Higashiusuki District: Morotsuka
Kumamoto Prefecture
Aso District: Takamori
Kamimashiki District: Yamato
Ōita Prefecture
Taketa
Bungo-ōno

Climate
Takachiho has a humid subtropical climate (Köppen climate classification Cfa) with hot, humid summers and cool winters.

Demographics
Per Japanese census data, the population of Takachiho in 2020 is 11,642 people. Takachiho has been conducting censuses since 1960.

History
During World War Two, the 2nd Raiding Brigade trained in the town and were sometimes known as the Takachiho paratroopers.

Mythology
According to Japanese mythology, Takachiho is the land where Ninigi descended from the heavens, sent by Amaterasu, the sun goddess. It contains the Ama-no-Iwato shrine which is, according to myth, the location of the cave where Amaterasu hid until Ame-no-Uzume lured her out.

Education

Prefectural high schools
Takachiho High School

Junior high schools
Takachiho Junior High School
Tabaru Junior High School
Iwato Junior High School
Kamino Junior High School

Elementary schools
Takachiho Elementary School
Oshikata Elementary School
Tabaru Elementary School
Iwato Elementary School
Kamino Elementary School

Transportation

Air
The nearest airport is Kumamoto Airport.

Rail
Takachiho Railway
Takachiho Line (inactive)
Ama-no-iwato Station - Takachiho Station

Road
National highways
Japan National Route 218
Takachiho Roadside Station
Japan National Route 325

Scenic and historic places

Takachiho is the heart of the Himuka Myth Road, which extends throughout Miyazaki.
 Takachiho Gorge
Manai Waterfall
Kunimigaoka
Ama-no-iwato Jinja Shinto Shrine
Shonenji Temple
Takachiho Onsen
Takachiho Shrine

References

External links

Official website 
Takachiho-cho Tourism Association 

Towns in Miyazaki Prefecture